The Sunda pangolin (Manis javanica), also known as the Malayan or Javan pangolin, is a species of pangolin.

It is found throughout Southeast Asia, including Myanmar, Thailand, Cambodia, Laos, Malaysia, Singapore, Vietnam, and the islands of Borneo, Java, Sumatra and the Lesser Sunda Islands. It prefers forested habitats (primary, secondary, and scrub forest) and plantations (rubber, palm oil). A large part of its life is spent in trees.

Taxonomy
In the past, this species has included the closely related Palawan pangolin (M. culionensis), as both are in the subgenus Paramanis. It is closely related to the Chinese pangolin, although the Malayan species is larger, lighter in colour, and has shorter fore claws.

Description
The skin of the Sunda pangolin's feet is granular, although pads are found on its front feet. It has thick and powerful claws to dig into the soils in search of ant nests or to tear into termite mounds. The Sunda pangolin has poor eyesight, but a highly developed sense of smell. Lacking teeth, its long, sticky tongue serves to collect ants and termites. Its body is covered by rows of scales and fibrous hair. The head-body length of this pangolin can measure 40–65 cm, tail length is 35–56 cm, and its weight is up to 10 kg. Males are larger than females.

Behaviour and ecology
Pangolins give birth annually to one or two offspring. They breed in the autumn, and females give birth in the winter burrow. Den preference has been known to shift at this time to favor mature forest tree hollows. Presumably, these hollows offer more fortification and stability for the decreased mobility that comes with birthing and caring for young. The amount of time the mother will spend at any one of these dens will increase during parental care periods. Parental care is given for about three months. In these three months, the range of the mother Pangolin drastically decreases as she travels and forages with her offspring. Only a few weeks before the offspring becomes fully independent, the mother and her young can display brief spikes in diurnal activity. Pangolins are sometimes found in pairs, but normally they are solitary, nocturnal, and behave timidly. They protect their soft underparts by rolling into balls when they feel threatened. They are strong diggers and make burrows lined with vegetation for insulation near termite mounds and ant nests.

Sunda pangolins have low immunity, making them sensitive to fluctuations in temperature.

The Sunda pangolin's main predators are humans, tigers, and the clouded leopard.

Conservation
Pangolins as a family are among the most heavily poached and exploited protected animals. Like other pangolin species, the Sunda pangolin is hunted for its skin, scales, and meat, used in clothing manufacture and traditional medicine. Scales are made into rings as charms against rheumatic fever, and meat is eaten by indigenous peoples. Despite enjoying protected status almost everywhere in its range, illegal international trade, largely driven by Chinese buyers, has led to rapidly decreasing population numbers. The Sunda pangolin is currently considered to be critically endangered.
As of 2016, all pangolin species are listed on CITES Appendix I, which prohibits commercial international trade of wild-caught specimens or their body parts. China raised the protection status of all pangolin species to the highest level in 2020.

Health
A metagenomic study published in 2019 previously revealed that SARS-CoV, the strain of the virus that causes SARS, was the most widely distributed coronavirus among a sample of Sunda pangolins. On 7 February 2020, it was announced that researchers from Guangzhou had discovered a pangolin sample with a viral nucleic acid sequence "99% identical" to SARS-CoV-2. When released, the results clarified that "the receptor-binding domain of the S protein of the newly discovered Pangolin-CoV is virtually identical to that of 2019-nCoV, with one amino acid difference." Pangolins are protected under Chinese law, but their poaching and trading for use in traditional Chinese medicine remains common.

Pangolin coronaviruses found to date only share at most 92% of their whole genomes with SARS-CoV-2, making them less similar than RaTG13 to SARS-CoV-2. This is insufficient to prove pangolins to be the intermediate host; in comparison, the SARS virus responsible for the 2002–2004 outbreak shared 99.8% of its genome with a known civet coronavirus.

References

External links

 Sunda pangolin at Ecology Asia 
 Sunda pangolin at Animal Diversity Web
 WWF & TRAFFIC Report: Pangolin trade in Sabah (PDF)
 WWF News: Seized notebooks give unique insight into scale of illicit pangolin trade

Manis
Mammals of Southeast Asia
Myrmecophagous mammals
Mammals of Borneo
Mammals of Brunei
Mammals of Cambodia
Mammals of China
Mammals of Indonesia
Mammals of Laos
Mammals of Malaysia
Mammals of Myanmar
Mammals of Singapore
Mammals of Thailand
Mammals of Vietnam
Mammals described in 1822
Critically endangered fauna of Asia
Critically endangered fauna of Indonesia